Filton Abbey Wood railway station serves the town of Filton in South Gloucestershire, England. There are four platforms but minimal facilities. The station is managed by Great Western Railway that operates all services.

Filton Abbey Wood is the third station on the site. The first station, Filton, was opened in 1863 by the Bristol and South Wales Union Railway. The station had a single platform, with a second added in 1886 to cope with traffic from the Severn Tunnel. The station was closed in 1903, replaced by a new station, Filton Junction,  further north, which was built at the junction with the newly constructed Badminton Line from Wootton Bassett Junction. The new station had four platforms, each with waiting rooms and large canopies.

Services at Filton Junction declined in the second half of the twentieth century, with the station buildings and Badminton Line platforms demolished in 1976. The station was closed completely in September 1996, replaced by the current station, Filton Abbey Wood. The station was built with two platforms, but a third was added in 2004 and a fourth in 2018.

The line through Filton Abbey Wood is not electrified. Platform 4 was completed in 2018 as part of the Filton Bank four-tracking project, allowing increased services between Bristol Parkway and Bristol Temple Meads.

History 
There have been three different stations in the area of Filton Abbey Wood. The first, Filton, opened in 1863 just north the site of the current Filton Abbey Wood, and was closed in 1903. A second station was opened a few hundred yards to the north, and was known as Filton Junction. This station closed in 1996, replaced by Filton Abbey Wood.

First station: Filton 
At New Passage, passengers were transferred to a ferry to cross the Severn to continue on into Wales. The line, engineered by Isambard Kingdom Brunel, was built as single track  broad gauge, with a platform on the western side of the line. The station was situated in the county of Gloucestershire,  from Bristol Temple Meads and immediately south of the modern bridge over the A4174 Avon Ring Road. The BSWUR was amalgamated with the Great Western Railway, who had from the beginning operated all BSWUR services, in 1868; and in 1873 the line was converted to  standard gauge. Although the line made travel from Bristol to Wales easier, the change from train to ferry to train was inconvenient, and so a tunnel was built under the River Severn. To cope with the anticipated increase in demand, the line through Filton was doubled, with a new platform built on the eastern side of the new track, complete with waiting room. The new track was first used on 1 September 1886 when the Severn Tunnel opened. The station continued in use until 1 July 1903, when it was closed and replaced by a new station  further north. There is no trace remaining of the original station.

Second station: Filton Junction 

In 1900, almost all trains from London to Wales travelled via Bath and Bristol, with some still routed via . The new line opened in 1903, and allowed faster services to Wales. There was a new triangular junction between Patchway and Filton, with the new line coming in from the east. The new station, opened on 1 July 1903, was on an embankment at the southern apex of the junction, just north of the present A4174.

The new station had four platform faces - two outer platforms, and two inner platforms sharing an island between the southbound line from Patchway and the westbound line to London. The western platforms served trains between Bristol and Wales, while the eastern platforms served trains on the new line. The platforms were linked by a subway which led to the booking office, situated on ground level by the main entrance on the east side of the station. The approach road led south from the main entrance, towards the A4174. There were waiting rooms and large canopies on each of the platforms. There were goods facilities to the south of the road, on the west side of the line and covering the site of the first station. There was a goods shed with a loading platform on a passing loop, as well as a north-facing covered loading platform and a south-facing siding. An additional south-facing siding for coal traffic was added after the First World War. Opposite the goods yard was Filton Junction Signal Box, which controlled the junction and by 1948 had more than 70 levers.

Following the opening of the Henbury Loop Line, which diverged from the line towards Wales  to the north, the station was renamed Filton Junction on 1 May 1910. Trains on this line used the western platforms, and often operated loop services to and from Bristol Temple Meads via . As well as being useful for passengers changing trains (due to its junction status), Filton Junction was also used by workers at the nearby Filton Aerodrome and the attendant aircraft works.

When the railways were nationalised in 1948, Filton Junction came under the aegis of the Western Region of British Railways. Following the publication of the Beeching Report, the Henbury Line was closed to passengers in 1964, and service levels began to decline. The goods yard was closed in July 1965, and the station's name reverted to Filton from 6 May 1968. Much of the station buildings were demolished in 1976, as were the platforms serving Badminton Line trains, as no trains on this line called at Filton anymore. The remaining two platforms had small replacement shelters built on them.

In 1974, when the Local Government Act 1972 came into effect, the southern part of Gloucestershire, including the district of Filton, became part of the new county of Avon. British Rail was split into business-led sectors in the 1980s, at which time operations at Filton passed to Regional Railways.

In the 1990s, plans were made to build a new station in Filton and close the 1903 station. The last train called on 8 March 1996, with services moving to the new Filton Abbey Wood from 11 March, with two intervening days of no service due to a closure of the Severn Tunnel. The remains of Filton Junction can still be seen from passing trains, and the two western platforms are still present, albeit overgrown. The subway has been blocked off, and the access road is now a residential street called "The Sidings".

Third station: Filton Abbey Wood 

In the early 1990s, the Ministry of Defence procurement division was consolidated into a major office development in Filton, known as MoD Abbey Wood. As part of this development, a new station was built in Filton, primarily to serve the MoD workers. Construction began in 1995, and cost £1,400,000. The station, named Filton Abbey Wood, was opened to the public on 11 March 1996 and officially opened on 19 March by Minister for Transport Steven Norris MP and the Chair of Avon County Council. Shortly after the station was opened, the county of Avon was disbanded, with the Filton region now governed by South Gloucestershire council.

A ramped footbridge connected the platforms at the north end, and each platform had ground-level access from the sides: the eastern, southbound platform from MoD Abbey Wood; the western, northbound platform via a footpath from the car park to the north. There were metal and glass shelters on each platform and a small, rarely used booking office on the southbound platform.

Services towards Bath were of particular importance to the MoD, as many of their staff had been based there prior to the construction of MoD Abbey Wood. South Gloucestershire council provided a subsidy for half-hourly services to Bath. The station proved popular with MoD workers, local residents commuting into central Bristol, and also students and staff at the University of the West of England.

When the railway was privatised in 1997, local services were franchised to Wales & West, which was succeeded by Wessex Trains  in 2001. The line through Filton closed for two weeks in June 2004 to enable the construction of a new platform and third running line on the west side of the station, separating trains towards Bristol Parkway from trains towards Wales before the station, and so allowing through-trains to pass stopping trains. The project cost £16 million, and caused the complete suspension of Severn Beach Line services to allow longer-distance services to use it as a diversion.

The Wessex franchise was amalgamated with the Great Western franchise into the Greater Western franchise from 2006, and responsibility passed to First Great Western which was subsequently rebranded as Great Western Railway in 2015. From December 2006, Virgin CrossCountry began operating a single daily service Newcastle to Cardiff Central via Bristol Temple Meads and Filton Abbey Wood.

A three-week closure of the line and station in late October & early/mid November 2018 saw all trains replaced by buses between Bristol Parkway and Bristol Temple Meads and on the Severn Beach branch whilst the four track layout between Dr Day's Junction and Filton Junction was reinstated, also bringing a new fourth platform at Filton Abbey Wood into use and short extensions to the southern ends of the other three platforms to fully accommodate 5 carriage 23 metre vehicle trains.

Location 

Filton Abbey Wood railway station is located in the Filton area of South Gloucestershire, within the Bristol conurbation. The area to the west of the station is primarily residential, while to the east is a large commercial area, including MoD Abbey Wood which is adjacent to the station. The main access to the station is via a long footpath (a slope of approximately 1 in 8) and bridge from Emma-Chris Way to the north, which has a small car park. There is also foot access from MoD Abbey Wood to the east. The station is just north of Filton South Junction, where the northbound line to South Wales and the westbound line to Avonmouth split from the line to Bristol Parkway, and just south of Filton Junction No. 1, where the southbound lines from South Wales and Parkway converge.

Facilities 
Facilities at the station are minimal - there are metal and glass shelters on each platform, and some seating. A small ticket office operates on platform 1 on weekday afternoons, there is also a machine for buying tickets but the station is generally unstaffed. There are customer help points, giving next train information for all platforms, as well as dot-matrix displays showing the next trains on each platform. A small pay and display car park with 30 spaces is to the north of the station, as are racks for eight bicycles. CCTV cameras are in operation at the station.

Passenger volume 
Over the decade 2002–2012, passenger numbers at Filton Abbey Wood almost doubled, from 395,000 to 771,000. In the 2006/07 financial year, over 50,000 passengers used Filton Abbey Wood to travel to or from Bristol Temple Meads.

Platform layout 
Services typically use the following platforms:

Platform 1 - Services heading towards Bristol Temple Meads from Bristol ParkwayPlatform 2 - Services heading towards Bristol Parkway from Bristol Temple MeadsPlatform 3 - Services heading towards Bristol Temple Meads from Cardiff CentralPlatform 4 - Services heading towards Cardiff Central from Bristol Temple Meads

Services

Filton Abbey Wood is managed by Great Western Railway which operates all services from the station. The basic service Monday to Friday is four trains per hour in each direction, split between four services. CrossCountry services pass non-stop.

The London to Swansea service is operated by Class 800s or Class 802s.

The standard journey time to Bristol Temple Meads is 8 minutes, to Bristol Parkway is 4 minutes, and to Cardiff Central is 50 minutes.

On weekdays only, a Parliamentary service also travels via Bristol West Curve, avoiding Bristol Temple Meads. It departs at 15:59 and stops next at Keynsham.

Future 
The line through Filton Abbey Wood was due to have been electrified by 2017 as part of the Great Western Main Line electrification project, however this has been postponed indefinitely. The group Friends of Suburban Bristol Railways supports the electrification continuing beyond the main lines, as does MP for Weston-super-Mare John Penrose. A fourth platform has been added in November 2018 as part of the project.

Filton Abbey Wood is on the / corridor, one of the main axes of the Greater Bristol Metro, a rail transport plan which aims to enhance transport capacity in the Bristol area.

Notes

See also
 Rail services in Bristol

References

External links 

Filton
Railway stations in Bristol, Bath and South Gloucestershire
Railway stations in Great Britain opened in 1996
Railway stations opened by Railtrack
Railway stations served by Great Western Railway
DfT Category F1 stations